Sost or Sust is a village in  Gojal, Upper Hunza, Gilgit–Baltistan, Pakistan. It is the last town inside Pakistan on the Karakoram Highway before the Chinese border. It is elevated 2,800 meters above sea level. The town is an important place on the highway for all passenger and cargo transport because all traffic crossing the Pakistan-China border passes through this town; the Pakistani immigration and customs departments are based here. Pakistan and China have opened border for trade and tourism at Khunjerab. 

The Silk Route Dry Port started its business operations at the port Sost (Upper Hunza) near Khunjarab pass Gilgit-Baltistan. Annual trade between China and Pakistan has increased from less than $2 billion in 2002 to $6.9 billion, with a goal of $15 billion by 2014. Sost dry port is the first formal port at the China-Pakistan border, facilitating customs clearance and other formalities for goods moving from the city of Kashgar and the surrounding Xinjiang autonomous region in China to the commercial centers of Pakistan. The town is connected by the Karakoram Highway to Gulmit, Aliabad, Gilgit and Chilas on the south and the Chinese cities of Tashkurgan, Upal and Kashgar in the north.

The Main languages spoken here are Wakhi and Brushki.

Karakoram Highway
The Sost dry port is connected by the Karakoram Highway to Gulmit, Aliabad, Gilgit and Chilas on the south and to the Chinese cities of Tashkurgan, Upal and Kashgar in the north.  The Northern Areas Transport Corporation offers passenger road service between Islamabad, Gilgit and Sost. Passenger road service between Tashkurgan and Sost also exists. Road service between Kashgar and Gilgit (via Tashkurgan and Sost) started in summer 2006. However, the border crossing between China and Pakistan at Khunjerab Pass (the highest border of the world) is open only between April 1 and November 30. Under the protocol agreement signed by Pakistan and Chinese authorities, the border is usually closed on Nov 30 and reopened on April 1 every year.

External links 

 Sost Dry Port
 Sust dry port starts functioning

Populated places in Hunza District
China–Pakistan border crossings